Hang up or hangup or variants may refer to:

Communications
 Hang up, the act of ending a telephone call
 Hangup or SIGHUP, a signal sent to a computer process when its controlling terminal is closed

Film and TV
 Hangup, a 1974 film directed by Henry Hathaway
 Hang Up, a 1987 radio play by Anthony Minghella revived in 2008
 Hang Ups (TV series)

Music
The Hang Ups band
Hang-Ups (album), by Goldfinger

Songs

 "Hang Up", a song from the 1954 By the Beautiful Sea (musical)
 "Hang-Up", a song on the 1971 album Morning, Noon & the Nite-Liters by The Nite-Liters
 "Hangup", a song on the 1997 Hermit (album) by Ron "Bumblefoot" Thal
 "Hang Up", a song on the 2003 album Fiends of Dope Island by The Cramps
 "Hang Up", a song on the 2006 album The Impossible Dream (Andy Abraham album)
 "Hang Up", a song on the 2008 album Fighting for Voltage by Left Spine Down
 "Hang Up", a remix on the 2009 album Smartbomb 2.3: The Underground Mixes by Left Spine Down
 "Hang Up", a song on the 2014 Lion (Peter Murphy album)

See also

Hang (disambiguation)
The Hang Ups, an indie pop rock band
Hang-Ups, a 1997 album by Goldfinger
Hung Up (disambiguation)